Ilaka KisKishoreganj is a Hindi film directed by the husband-wife duo of J Nutan-Pankaj. The film has been produced under the banners of Ma Devdi Motion Pictures, Tej World Entertainment, Daksh World Entertainment and Anukriti Entertainment Private Ltd. The cast includes Rohit RK, Shikha Swarup, Rupesh Kumar Charan Pahari, Deepak Lohar, Lilawati,  and Anand Kumar.

Cast
Rohit RK
Shikha Swaroop
Rupesh Kumar Charan Pahari
Deepak Lohar
Lilawati
Anand Kumar
Monika Mundu

References

External links